is a Japanese manga artist. Her manga are typically shōjo works that are serialized in Ribon magazine. She is best known for writing Kero Kero Chime which was adapted into a 30-episode anime series by the Studio Comet.

Published works
 Kero Kero Chime (1996–1997, serialized in Ribon, Shueisha)
 Twinkle Tiara (1999, Shueisha)
 Neringu Project (2000, Shueisha)
 Kyūketsu byōin e ikō! (1996, Shueisha)
 Emi yu ranpu (2001–2002, Shueisha)
 Shinigami-kun no Oshigoto (2002, Shueisha)
 Maigo no Kemonotachi (2004, Shueisha)
 P Angel (2005, Shueisha)
 Shizuka Hakkenden (2006, Shueisha)
 Happy Pharmacy
 Taiyou ga ippai
 N.G. heroine
 Kawaiteki shinigami

References

External links

1971 births
Living people
Manga artists from Miyagi Prefecture